Coleosporium is a genus of rust fungi in the family Coleosporiaceae. The genus contains about 100 species. The aecial stages are parasitic on Pinus spp., and the telial stages on a wide range of angiosperms.

Selected species
Coleosporium asterum  parasite of Solidago gigantea
Coleosporium carneum
Coleosporium clematidis
Coleosporium clerodendri
Coleosporium delicatulum
Coleosporium eupatorii
Coleosporium helianthi
Coleosporium ipomoeae
Coleosporium leptodermidis
Coleosporium ligulariae
Coleosporium madiae
Coleosporium pacificum
Coleosporium perillae
Coleosporium plectranthi
Coleosporium plumeriae
Coleosporium saussureae
Coleosporium telekiae
Coleosporium tussilaginis
Coleosporium zanthoxyli

Range
Mostly the Northern Hemisphere.

References

External links

Pucciniales
Basidiomycota genera
Taxa named by Joseph-Henri Léveillé
Taxa described in 1847